Manuel Romero may refer to:
Manuel Romero Rubio (1828-1895), Mexican politician
Manuel Romero (director) (1891-1954), Argentine film director
Manuel Romero (footballer) (born 1950), Spanish footballer